Verkhnyaya Sergiyevskaya is a rural locality (a village) in Cherevkovskoye Rural Settlement, Krasnoborsky District, Arkhangelsk Oblast, Russia. The population was 104 as of 2010.

Geography 
Verkhnyaya Sergiyevskaya is located 35 km northwest of Krasnoborsk (the district's administrative centre) by road. Andreyevskaya is the nearest rural locality.

References 

Rural localities in Krasnoborsky District